Ariane is an opera in five acts by Jules Massenet to a French libretto by Catulle Mendès after Greek mythology (the tale of Ariadne).  It was first performed at the Palais Garnier in Paris on 31 October 1906, with Lucienne Bréval in the title role.

History
Although not a proper sequel, as Ariane dies in both pieces, Massenet's later opera, Bacchus is a companion to Ariane, containing a number of common characters and the same librettist.  Ariane has never maintained popularity and belongs to Massenet's later works that were considered outmoded for their date of composition.  The piece did, however, inspire this quote from the great French composer Gabriel Fauré: "Ariane, a noble, great and moving work..." The opera was performed during Massenet's life-time, then was dropped from the repertoire, receiving only limited revivals in 1937 (21 February and 27 August 1937) at the Paris Opéra.

Recently it has received performances in a new production at the Massenet Festival in Saint-Étienne on 9 November  2007, directed by Jean-Louis Pichon, conducted by Laurent Campellone. As one critic noted, it is one of the most Wagnerian of Massenet's operas.

Roles

Synopsis
The story is based on the mythology surrounding Theseus and the sisters Ariane and Phèdre.  The two sisters are both in love with Theseus, yet he chooses Phèdre over Ariane.  When Phèdre is killed by the toppled statue of Adonis, Ariane travels to the underworld to beg Perséphone for her sister's resurrection.  Softened by Ariane's offering of roses, Perséphone complies and Phèdre returns to earth.  Theseus is then made to choose between the sisters again and once more chooses Phèdre, abandoning Ariane on the shore of Naxos.  Distraught, she is lured into the sea by the voices of the beckoning sirens.

References
Notes

External links
Vocal score of Ariane at IMSLP

Operas by Jules Massenet
French-language operas
Operas
1906 operas
Operas based on classical mythology
Opera world premieres at the Paris Opera
Ariadne
Cultural depictions of Theseus